Moussa Badiane (born 16 October 1981) is a French former professional basketball player.

Professional career
During his pro career, Badiane played with the French club Antibes. He was the French 2nd Division French Player's MVP in 2010.

References

French men's basketball players
1981 births
Living people
East Carolina Pirates men's basketball players
SLUC Nancy Basket players